Dominic Lester is an American sound engineer. He was nominated for an Academy Award in the category Best Sound for the film Shakespeare in Love. He worked on 59 films from 1987 to 2000.

Selected filmography
 Shakespeare in Love (1998)

References

External links

Year of birth missing (living people)
Living people
American audio engineers